= OC (film) =

Indian film

- Directed by: Vshnu Bompally
- Written by: Vshnu Bompally
- Produced by: BVS
- Starring: Harish Bompally; Maanya Saladi; Lakshmi Kiran; Roiel Shree; Vivek Chepuri; Jeevan Kumar; Yogi Khatri
- Music by: Bhole Shavali
- Release date: 7 June 2024
- Running time: 112 minutes
- Country: India
- Language: Telugu

OC is a 2024 Indian Telugu language film directed by Vshnu Bompally.

== Cast ==
- Harish Bompally
- Maanya Saladi
- Lakshmi Kiran
- Roiel Shree
- Vivek Chepuri
- Jeevan Kumar
- Yogi Khatri
